Definitive INXS is a compilation of Australian rock band INXS released in 2002. It has almost the same track listing as The Best of INXS. The compilation features most of their hit singles, as well as two previously unreleased tracks, "Salvation Jane" and "Tight". "Salvation Jane" is an outtake taken from the X sessions in 1990. The 2002 remaster of X features the song's original demo. "Tight" was written by songwriter and multi-instrumentalist Andrew Farriss and recorded by the band during the sessions for Welcome to Wherever You Are in 1992. The song was reworked by the remaining members of INXS in 2002 after the death of vocalist Michael Hutchence in 1997. The compilation also features a cover of Steppenwolf's "Born to Be Wild", which was specially recorded for the April 1993 launch of Virgin Radio in the UK and was first included on the Japanese release of Full Moon, Dirty Hearts.

Reception

In his AllMusic review, writer Andy Kellman rated the compilation four stars out of five and compared Definitive INXS with other different double-disc INXS anthologies released that same year, calling Definitive INXS "considerably different" and highlighted the differences in both discs. He said, "While it's nice to have the disc of videos, it's the type of thing that only hardcore fans - and not people who just want the hits - would care to have." He ended his review by saying, "The saving grace is that Definitive INXS goes for the price of a single disc, but a band with too many key moments to fit onto one disc is deserving of better, like Shine Like It Does and The Years."

Commercial performance
Although the album never charted in the band's native Australia, it was soon certified platinum by the Australian Recording Industry Association (ARIA) in March 2003 for sales of 70,000 copies. The album entered the New Zealand charts three years later on 8 August 2005 where it peaked at number 4 and remained in the charts for 4 weeks. It was certified platinum by the Recorded Music NZ (RMNZ) for sales of 15,000 copies. Definitive INXS also performed well in the United Kingdom peaking at number 15 and staying in the charts for 4 weeks. The British Phonographic Industry (BPI) certified the album gold on 22 July 2013 for sales of 100,000 copies.

Track listing
Disc 1

Disc 2 (Bonus content)

Charts and certifications

Charts

Certifications

References

INXS compilation albums
2002 compilation albums